Rockin' You Tonight is the second album released by American country music artist Blaine Larsen. Released in 2006 on BNA Records (in association with Giantslayer Records), the album produced two singles for Larsen on the Hot Country Songs charts: "I Don't Know What She Said" and "Spoken Like a Man", which respectively reached number 24 and number 42. Also included is a cover of Mac Davis's "Baby, Don't Get Hooked on Me", as well as "I'm in Love with a Married Woman", which was previously recorded and released as a single by Mark Chesnutt from his 2002 self-titled album. "Let Alone You" was later recorded by Easton Corbin on his eponymous debut album in 2010.

Track listing

Personnel
 Eddie Bayers - drums, percussion
 Spady Brannan - bass guitar
 Perry Coleman - background vocals
 Mickey Jack Cones - background vocals
 J.T. Corenflos - baritone guitar, electric guitar
 Stuart Duncan - fiddle, mandolin
 Kevin "Swine" Grantt - bass guitar
 Tommy Harden - drums, percussion
 Blaine Larsen - lead vocals
 Chris Leuzinger - baritone guitar, electric guitar
 Bill McDermott - electric guitar
 Brent Mason - electric guitar
 Jimmy Nichols - accordion, Hammond organ, piano, synthesizer horns, Wurlitzer
 Danny Parks - electric guitar
 Biff Watson - acoustic guitar, nylon string guitar, hi-string guitar
 Gretchen Wilson - duet vocals on "Lips of a Bottle"
 Lonnie Wilson - drums, percussion
 Glenn Worf - bass guitar

Chart performance

Album

References

2006 albums
BNA Records albums
Blaine Larsen albums